Raising the Wind may refer to:

 Raising the Wind, an 1803 farce by James Kenney in which the character Jeremy Diddler appears
 Raising the Wind (1925 film), a British short comedy film directed by Leslie S. Hiscott
 Raising the Wind (1961 film), a British comedy film directed by Gerald Thomas